Maria Espinosa (born Paula Cronbach; 1939) is an American novelist, poet, and translator.

Personal life
Espinosa was born January 6, 1939, in Boston, Massachusetts, to sculptor Robert Cronbach and a poet mother, Maxine Cronbach. She grew up on Long Island with two younger brothers, Michael Cronbach, and Lee Cronbach, a musician.  She attended Harvard and Columbia Universities and received an M.A. in creative writing from San Francisco State University. While living in Paris, she met and married Mario Espinosa Wellmann, a writer and photographer. Their marriage was tumultuous and lasted only a few years. In 1978 she married Walter Selig, a research chemist who fled from Nazi Germany as a child. Most of her adult life she has lived in Northern California. She currently lives in Albuquerque, New Mexico. She has one daughter from her first marriage, Carmen Espinosa, a dancer and social worker.

Career
At Harvard Espinosa studied with postmodern American novelist John Hawkes. While at Columbia she sent corresponded with Anais Nin, who strongly encouraged her writing. In the 1970s  she studied with Leonard Bishop at private workshops held in people's homes in Berkeley, California.  She has taught at New College of California, City College of San Francisco, as a guest writer at the University of Adelaide, Australia, and  has mentored women with the Afghan Women's Writing Project. She has led many informal writing workshops. Her poetry, articles translations, and short fiction have appeared in numerous anthologies.

Awards
 1996 American Book Award for Longing.
 2010 PEN Oakland awards Josephine Miles Award for Literary Excellence.

Works

Poetry
 Love Feelings, Four Winds, 1967
 Night Music, The Tides, 1969

Novels
   (reprint Arte Publico Press, 1995)
 
 
 
 Suburban Souls. Tailwinds Press. 2020. .

Translation

Anthologies

References

External links
"Author's website"
"Maria Espinosa", Red Room
"Ample Substance: Maria Espinosa on Pamela Uschuk’s Crazy Love", Gently Read Literature
"Interview with Nino Valaoritis," The Rumpus, 2018/08
"Catalina Mi Amor," Persimmontree Spring 2018
The Magnolia Review, archives, volume 5, issue 2
Yellow Mama Archives
Fixed Free Poetry Anthology, 2018
The New Mexico Jewish Link, "Protesting the Detention of Asylum Seekers," by Maria Espinosa
Authors Answer, "Interview with Maria Espinosa, 5/11/20"

20th-century American novelists
Living people
Harvard University alumni
Columbia University alumni
San Francisco State University alumni
Hispanic and Latino American novelists
21st-century American novelists
American women novelists
American women poets
Jewish American novelists
20th-century American women writers
21st-century American women writers
20th-century American poets
21st-century American poets
20th-century American translators
21st-century American translators
American Book Award winners
Year of birth missing (living people)
21st-century American Jews